Speech of Universal History or Discours sur l'histoire universelle in original French (1681) is a work of theology and philosophy from French Roman Catholic bishop Jacques-Bénigne Bossuet. It is regarded by many Catholics as a continuation or actualization of St. Augustine of Hippo’s the City of God (De Civitate Dei). It proposes, much like the City of God, a metaphysical appreciation of universal history as an actual war between God and the Devil.

Spiritual warfare
In this war, God moves (by divine intervention/ Divine providence) those governments, political/ideological movements and military forces aligned (or aligned the most) with the Catholic Church (the City of God)  in order to oppose by all means (including military) those governments, political/ideological movements and military forces aligned (or aligned the most) with the Devil (the City of the Devil). While the City of God is always the Church and those movements or governments that support it, the City of the Devil changes significantly with the centuries.

In Catholic doctrine
This concept of universal history is actual part of the official doctrine of the Catholic Church as was most recently stated in the Second Vatican Council' s Gaudium et Spes document: "The Church ... holds that in her most benign Lord and Master can be found the key, the focal point and the goal of man, as well as of all human history...all of human life, whether individual or collective, shows itself to be a dramatic struggle between good and evil, between light and darkness...The Lord is the goal of human history the focal point of the longings of history and of civilization, the center of the human race, the joy of every heart and the answer to all its yearnings" (GS 10, 13, 45).

Key points
The Catholic Encyclopedia  depicts the key point of Speech of Universal History as follows:

“…This is why the idea of Providence is at the same time the law of history. If the crash of empires "falling one upon another" does not in truth express some purpose of God regarding humanity, then history, or what is called by that name, is indeed no longer anything but a chaotic chronology, the meaning of which we should strive in vain to disentangle. In that case, fortune, or rather chance, would be the mistress of human affairs; the existence of humanity would be only a bad dream, or phantasmagoria, whose changing face would be inadequate to mask a void of nothingness. We should be fretting ourselves in that void without reason and almost without cause, our very actions would be but phantoms, and the only result of so many efforts accumulated through so many thousands of years would be the conviction, every day more clear, of their uselessness, which would be another void of nothingness.

And why, after all, were there Greeks and Romans? Of what use was Salamis? Actium? Poitiers? Lepanto? Why was there a Caesar, and a Charlemagne? Let us frankly own, then, that unless something Divine circulates in history, there is no history.

Nations like individuals, live only by maintaining uninterrupted communication with God, and it is precisely this condition of their existence which is called by the name of Providence. Providence is the condition or the possibility of history, as the stability of the laws of nature is the condition of the possibility of science. ..It was Providence that made of the Jewish people a people apart, a unique people, the chosen people, charged with maintaining and defending the worship of the true God throughout the pagan centuries, against the prestige of an idolatry which essentially consisted in the deification of the energies of nature. It was Providence that, by means of Roman unity and of its extension throughout the known universe, rendered not only possible but easy and almost necessary, the conversion of the world to Christianity. It was Providence, again, that developed the features of the modern world out of the disorder of barbarous invasions and reconciled the two antiquities under the law of Christ. If the action of Providence is manifest anywhere, it is in the sequence of the history of Christianity. And what is more natural under the circumstances than to make of its history the demonstration of its truth?"

References

Works about history
French literature
Catholic theology and doctrine